Basankusu Territory is an administrative division of Équateur Province in the Democratic Republic of the Congo.
The headquarters is the town of Basankusu.

Being slightly more than 1° north of the Equator, Basankusu has a tropical rainforest climate. There is no real dry season, with monthly rainfall in the town ranging between averages of 69 mm and 213 mm, with most months at the higher end of that range. Average high temperatures over a year are between 30 °C and 33 °C, although throughout the day a high of 37 °C is not uncommon. Evening lows average around 20 °C.

Basankusu territory is divided into 3 sectors
Waka-Bokeka, with 15 groupings of 110 villages
Basankusu, with 11 groupings of 96 villages
Gombalo, with 13 groupings of 117 villages

References

Territories of Équateur Province